Lutcher High School, established in 1913, is located in Lutcher, Louisiana, United States. Lutcher High School currently serves as the only source of secondary education on the east bank of St. James Parish.

Activities
Lutcher High offers a variety of organizations for students.

Clubs
 Art Club
 Band 
 Beta Club
 Book Club
 Fellowship of Christian Athletes -FCA
 4-H CLUB
 Junior Beta Club
 Yearbook Committee 
 Student Council

Corps Groups
 Cheerleading
 Dance Team
 Majorettes
 Flag Team
 Marching Band

Athletics
Lutcher High athletics competes in the LHSAA.

Sports

 Baseball
 Basketball
 Bowling
 Cross Country
 Football
 Golf
 Softball

 Soccer
 Swimming
 Tennis
 Track
 Volleyball
 Weightlifting
 Team Management/Trainer

Championships (52)
(9) Football state championships: 1975, 1978, 1983, 2003, 2006, 2008, 2015, 2016, 2022

(5) Baseball state championships: 1951, 1967, 1975, 2013, 2022

(15) Girls' Powerlifting state championships: 2007, 2008, 2009, 2010, 2011, 2012, 2013, 2014, 2015, 2016, 2017, 2018, 2019, 2021, 2022

(2) Softball state championships: 1998, 2009

(11) Boys' Swimming state championships: 1996, 1997, 1998, 1999, 2000, 2001, 2005, 2006, 2007, 2008, 2009

(1) Girls' Swimming state championship: 1951

(2) Boys' Powerlifting: 2010, 2021

(1) Boys' Track & Field: 1979

(2) Girls' Track & Field: 1984, 1985

Notable alumni
Jarvis Landry, NFL wide receiver for the New Orleans Saints
Dexter McCoil, NFL defensive back for the San Francisco 49ers
Jared Poché, Pitcher - Oakland Athletics
Tijuana Ricks, Actress
Lionel Washington, NFL, Defensive Back - Oakland Raiders
Lenny Webster, former MLB player (Minnesota Twins, Montreal Expos, Philadelphia Phillies, Baltimore Orioles, Boston Red Sox)
Corey Merrill, Pitcher - Tulane
Blaine Gautier, Quarterback - University of Louisiana, Receivers Coach - McNeese State, Analyst - LSU, Director Player Personnel - Baylor

Further reading
 The Bulldogs: A History of Lutcher High School Football by George Becnel, Rooftop Publishing (2007)

References

External links

 Lutcher High School website

Educational institutions in the United States with year of establishment missing
Public high schools in Louisiana
Schools in St. James Parish, Louisiana
Public middle schools in Louisiana